Mike Stock may refer to:

 Mike Stock (American football), American football coach from 1961 through 2009
 Mike Stock (musician) (born 1951), English songwriter and record producer